The men's marathon at the 1960 Summer Olympics in Rome, Italy, was held on Saturday September 10, 1960. There were 69 participants from 35 nations. The maximum number of athletes per nation had been set at 3 since the 1930 Olympic Congress. Abebe Bikila, who ran the race barefoot, finished in world record time and became the first sub-Saharan African to win an Olympic gold medal. All three of the medalists came from nations which had never before won an Olympic marathon medal.

Background

This was the 14th appearance of the event, which is one of 12 athletics events to have been held at every Summer Olympics. Returning runners from the 1956 marathon included gold medalist Alain Mimoun of France, silver medalist Franjo Mihalić of Yugoslavia, fourth-place finisher Lee Chang-hoon of South Korea, eighth-place finisher Evert Nyberg of Sweden, and tenth-place finisher Eino Oksanen of Finland. Sergei Popov of the Soviet Union, the world record holder and one of only two men (along with Jim Peters) to have run under 2 hours and 20 minutes, was favored.

Ceylon, Liberia, Morocco, and Tunisia each made their first appearance in Olympic marathons. The United States made its 14th appearance, the only nation to have competed in each Olympic marathon to that point.

Competition format and course

As all Olympic marathons, the competition was a single race. The marathon distance of 26 miles, 385 yards was run over a point-to-point course; it was the first marathon to neither start nor end at the Olympic Stadium. The course started at the Piazza di Campidoglio. It was a triangular loop, running along many of the wonders of Ancient Roma. The course passed along the Caracalla Baths, ran down the Appian Way, and finished under the Arch of Constantine.

Records

These were the standing world and Olympic records prior to the 1960 Summer Olympics.

Abebe Bikila set a new world record at 2:15:16.2; this record is still the record for barefoot running.

Schedule

The 1960 marathon started so late that the course required torchlight for the runners to see. The last finisher arrived at nearly 9:15 p.m. local time.

All times are Central European Time (UTC+1)

Results

References

External links
 Official report
 

M
Marathons at the Olympics
Men's marathons
Oly
Men's events at the 1960 Summer Olympics